The Bahamas International Securities Exchange (BISX) is a securities exchange in the Bahamas. It was founded in 1999 and is located in Nassau. The unique four symbol alphanumeric Market Identifier Code (MIC) used to identify the BISX as defined under ISO 10383. of the International Organization for Standardization (ISO) is: XBAA.

Listed companies

See also 
 Economy of the Bahamas
 List of stock exchanges in the Americas
 List of stock exchanges in the Commonwealth of Nations

References

Economy of the Bahamas
Financial services companies of the Bahamas
Stock exchanges in the Caribbean
1999 establishments in the Bahamas
Nassau, Bahamas